David Gibbs (born 15 March 1967 in Jamaica) is a former Bermudian cricketer. He played just once for Bermuda, a first-class ICC Intercontinental Cup match against the USA in 2004.

References

External links
Cricket Archive profile
Cricinfo profile

1967 births
Living people
Bermudian cricketers